Actia dubitata is a Palearctic species of fly in the family Tachinidae.

Distribution
Austria, Switzerland, France, Germany, Hungary, Kazakhstan, Russia.

References

dubitata
Muscomorph flies of Europe
Diptera of Asia
Insects described in 1971